"Živila Hrvatska" (lit. Long live Croatia) is a Croatian patriotic song. The lyrics were written by August Šenoa, while the melody was composed by Ivan Zajc. 

The lyrics first appeared in the September 1873 print of Vienac magazine and other Croatian publications, and was simply titled Hrvatska Pjesma ("Croatian song"). The composition was recorded in the 1893 book Hrvatska Pjesmarica by Vjekoslav Klaić, where it was titled as "Živila Hrvatska".

Lyrics

References

External links
 Glazbeni korzo 

19th-century songs
Croatian patriotic songs
Year of song unknown
Songs about Croatia